The 2009 European Parliament election in Italy was held on Saturday 6 and Sunday 7 June 2009, as decided by the Italian government on 18 December 2008. Italy elected 72 members of the European Parliament (MEPs).

Electoral system

The party-list proportional representation was the traditional electoral system of the Italian Republic from its establishment in 1946 to 1994, therefore it was also adopted to elect the Italian members of the European Parliament (MEPs) since 1979.

Two levels were introduced: a national level to divide the seats among parties and a constituency level to distribute them among candidates in open lists. Five constituencies were established, each including 2–5 regions and each electing a fixed number of MEPs. At national level, seats are divided between party lists using the largest remainder method with Hare quota. Seats are allocated to parties and then to their most voted candidates.

In the run-up of the election, the Italian Parliament has introduced a national threshold of 4% in the electoral law for the European Parliament. An exception was granted for parties representing some linguistic minorities as such lists can be connected with one of the major parties, combining their votes, provided that those parties reach the 4% threshold and that candidates from minority parties obtain a sufficient number of votes, no less than 50,000 for the main candidate.

Main parties and leaders

Outgoing MEPs
This is a list of Italian delegations sitting at the European Parliament before 6 June 2009.

Summary of parties 
In the following table the main parties/lists participating in the election are listed.

Results
The parties that passed the national electoral threshold at 4% were The People of Freedom (PdL), Democratic Party (PD), Northern League (LN), Italy of Values (IdV) and Union of the Centre (UdC).
This election was a victory for the Prime Minister Silvio Berlusconi: the parties supporting his government (The People of Freedom and Northern League) won 38 seats, while the opposition (Democratic Party, Italy of Values and Union of the Centre) obtained 34 seats.

On 1 December 2009, after the entry into force of the Treaty of Lisbon, the italian seats in the European Parliament increased from 72 to 73. The additional seat was assigned to the Union of the Centre (that went from 5 to 6 seats).

References

Italy
European Parliament elections in Italy
2009 elections in Italy